Senator Hobson may refer to:

Cal Hobson (born 1945), Oklahoma State Senate
Dave Hobson (born 1936), Ohio State Senate